The Pseudogarypidae are a small family of pseudoscorpions. Most recent species are found in North America, while one species is endemic to Tasmania.

Species

 Neopseudogarypus J.C.H. Morris, 1948
 Neopseudogarypus scutellatus J.C.H. Morris, 1948 — Tasmania
 Pseudogarypus Ellingsen, 1909
 Pseudogarypus banksi Jacot, 1938 — Quebec, northeastern United States
 Pseudogarypus bicornis (Banks, 1895)
 † Pseudogarypus extensus Beier, 1937 — fossil; Baltic amber
 † Pseudogarypus hemprichii (C. L. Koch & Berendt, 1854) — fossil; Baltic amber
 Pseudogarypus hesperus J.C. Chamberlin, 1931 — Oregon, Washington
 Pseudogarypus hypogeus Muchmore, 1981 — Arizona
 † Pseudogarypus minor Beier, 1947 — fossil; Baltic amber
 Pseudogarypus orpheus Muchmore, 1981 — California
 Pseudogarypus spelaeus Benedict & Malcolm, 1978 — California
 †Pseudogarypus synchrotron Henderickx, Tafforeau & Soriano, 2012 - fossil; Baltic amber

References
Notes

Bibliography
 Joel Hallan's Biology Catalog: Pseudogarypidae

 
Pseudoscorpion families